Xinxian  is a township-level division situated in Mengcun Hui Autonomous County, Cangzhou, Hebei, China.

See also
List of township-level divisions of Hebei

References

Township-level divisions of Hebei